In probability theory, independent increments are a property of stochastic processes and random measures. Most of the time, a process or random measure has independent increments by definition, which underlines their importance. Some of the stochastic processes that by definition possess independent increments are the Wiener process, all Lévy processes, all additive process
and the Poisson point process.

Definition for stochastic processes 
Let  be a stochastic process. Then the stochastic process has independent increments if and only if for every  and any choice  with

the random variables

are stochastically independent.

Definition for random measures 
A random measure  has got independent increments if and only if the random variables  are stochastically independent for every selection of pairwise disjoint measurable sets  and every .

Independent S-increments 

Then  is called a random measure with independent S-increments, if for all bounded sets  and all  the random measures  are independent.

Application 
Independent increments are a basic property of many stochastic processes and are often incorporated in their definition. The notion of independent increments and independent S-increments of random measures plays an important role in the characterization of Poisson point process and infinite divisibility

References 

Probability theory